Julio Scherer García (7 April 1926 – 7 January 2015) was a Mexican author and journalist. He was the editor of the daily newspaper Excélsior from 1968 to 1976. He also was the founder of the newsmagazine Proceso.

Scherer died of septic shock at the age of 88. The news of his death was reported on the website of Proceso.

Among other offspring is his son Julio Scherer Ibarra who is an attorney, writer and politician currently serving since 2018 as a juridical counselor to President Andrés Manuel López Obrador.es

References

1926 births
2015 deaths
Writers from Mexico City
Mexican newspaper founders
Mexican journalists
Male journalists
Mexican people of German descent
Deaths from sepsis